Parivartana may refer to:

 Parivartana (1954 film), an Indian Telugu film
 Parivartana (1975 film), an Indian Telugu film

See also 

 Parivartan, activism organisation based in New Delhi, India
 Parivartan (film), a 1949 Indian Hindi move